Maxwell Gruver died in a hazing ritual while pledging at the Louisiana State University chapter of Phi Delta Theta. He reportedly had condiments thrown at him while reciting the Greek alphabet and was forced to drink alcohol if he made mistakes. Phi Delta Theta suspended the university's chapter after the incident and ten men were arrested. Four of the men were indicted on charges of negligent homicide in March 2018.

Gruver was one of several pledges who died in hazing rituals nationwide in 2017, including Timothy Piazza at Penn State University, Andrew Coffey at Florida State University, and Matthew Ellis at Texas State University.

Facts 

Gruver's death was said by the coroner to have been caused by "acute alcohol intoxication with aspiration." In 2017, a warrant was issued for 10 members of the college fraternity Phi Delta Theta for the charge of hazing. On the night before his death Gruver attended what was called a "Bible Study" where pledges were asked questions about the fraternity and had to drink alcohol each time they answered incorrectly. They also had to perform some physical exercises during the "Bible Study" including wall sits while other members walked across their knees. The warrant stated that pledges were also required to lift other members while standing on a book. The pledges drank to excess and Gruver passed out on the couch and checked on him until 3AM at which time he was left alone between 3AM and 9AM. Gruver had also vomited remnants of spaghetti which blocked his airway. In the morning his pulse was weak and he was rushed to the hospital where he died.

Grand jury
The grand jury declined to bring charges in one case and failed to reach consensus in four others. They indicted four men on charges of negligent homicide. There was no consensus whether the national fraternal organization was criminally liable for the death.

Consequences 
Matthew Naquin was convicted of negligent homicide in July 2019 for his role in the hazing. Naquin had previously been asked by other fraternity members to tone down interactions with pledges that they described as "extreme and dangerous".

The Louisiana State University chapter of Phi Delta Theta was suspended after the incident by the fraternity's national organization. They also terminated the memberships of the accused, issuing a statement that the termination "effectively severs ties with those alleged to be involved."

References

Hazing
2017 deaths
Louisiana State University people
Phi Delta Theta
Criminal homicide
University folklore